Denis Clemenceau Schuller (born 5 May 1948) is a former Queensland cricketer, a fast bowler from the 1975–76 season to 1980–81.

References

External links
Denis Schuller at Cricinfo
Denis Schuller at CricketArchive

Australian cricketers
Queensland cricketers
1948 births
Living people
Australian people of German descent